Thomas Robert Veivers (born 6 April 1937) is an Australian former cricketer, teacher, politician and public administrator who played in 21 cricket Test matches between 1963 and 1967. He is the great-uncle of Jack Wildermuth.

Cricket career
Veivers was an all-rounder who bowled right-arm off-spin and batted left-handed. Educated at Downlands College, in Toowoomba in southeastern Queensland, he attended the University of Queensland, whom he represented in club cricket. In 1955 for Downlands College against Gregory Terrace at the Brisbane Oval, he scored a 155. He was made the captain of the Queensland Colts and scored 126 against the New South Wales Colts in 1958/59, their first win in the interstate Gregory Cup in 8 years.

He made his first-class debut in 1958–59 against the touring English cricket team and made his Sheffield Shield debut that season also. He did not command a regular spot in the Sheffield Shield team until the following season. He was selected for his first Australian squad in 1962, playing in an Australian XI against the visiting English team, in which he was hit for two sixes by Ted Dexter in his opening over. 

John Woodcock of The Times wrote: "I doubt if it is possible to hit a cricket ball any harder than Dexter did today. Melbourne is a huge ground and no one who hits a six here is likely to forget it. Against Veivers, an off-spinner, Dexter twice cleared the sightscreen, once by a good 20 yards." In the 2 matches against the MCC, his figures were 3 wickets for 310 and he was considered for the Test matches.

Veivers was selected for the Test team the following season to make his debut against South Africa in the First Test in Brisbane, in which he scored 14 batting at number 8 and took 1/48. He was omitted for the third and fourth Tests, but managed to defy the South Africans with stubborn batting in the fifth Test in Sydney, salvaging a draw. He toured England in 1964, playing all Tests and scoring two half-centuries and three three-wicket hauls. He followed this with 2 more half-centuries and a career-best of 4/68 on the tour to India. While scoring 74 in Chennai he hit Bapu Nadkarni, often considered an unhittable bowler, for 3 sixes.

He scored his Test best of 88 against Pakistan in Australia the following season but was unavailable to tour the West Indies in 1965 due to personal reasons. He had a difficult 1965-66 Ashes series back home against England, taking just four wickets and one half-century. He went on the 1966-67 tour of South Africa, which was his last international representation for Australia. He retired from first-class cricket the following year.

His bowling was economical but not penetrative, with a Test average of over 40. He bowled one of the longest known bowling spells in Test cricket - 55 six-ball overs in England's innings of 611 at Old Trafford in 1964. Veivers bowled 75 of the last 80 overs delivered from the City end and finished with figures of 95.1-36-155-3. This is the highest number of balls bowled in an innings of a Test match by an Australian and included a single unbroken spell of 51 overs and one ball. Veivers was the non-striker when Simpson reached the 300 and, one Test later, when Fred Trueman took his 300th wicket by dismissing Neil Hawke.

Later career
Veivers was a Brisbane radio station executive before serving as the secretary of the Queensland Cricket Association from 1974 to 1977 and a state selector from 1977 to 1982.

He had a brief political career, holding the seat of Ashgrove in the Legislative Assembly of Queensland from 1983 to 1986 for the Labor Party. He was Commissioner-General of the Australian Pavilion at World Expo 88 in Brisbane in 1988. He was Chairman of the Queensland Institute of Medical Research Trust from 1991 to 2000 and was appointed a Fellow of the Institute in 2000.

He was the president of the QCA from 1989 to 1992. He was made a Life Member of Queensland Cricket in 2006.

His cousins, Mick and Greg Veivers, both represented for Australia at rugby league, Greg captaining the national team. Mick went on to become a Queensland state politician. His great-nephew, Jack Wildermuth, has played Twenty20 International (T20I) cricket for Australia.

References

External links

1937 births
Living people
Australia Test cricketers
Australian cricket administrators
Australian cricketers
Australian Labor Party members of the Parliament of Queensland
Australian sportsperson-politicians
Members of the Queensland Legislative Assembly
Queensland cricketers
Tom